Thomas Henry Carter (October 30, 1854September 17, 1911) was an American politician, who served as territorial delegate, a United States representative, and a U.S. Senator from Montana. Carter was born in Junior Furnace, Ohio, on October 30, 1854. Born to an Irish immigrant family, he spent most of his childhood in on small farms in the Midwest. In 1882, he moved to Helena, Montana to begin his law career there. He entered then politics, and was elected Montana's territorial delegate in 1888. Following Montana's admission into the union as a state, Carter represented the state in U.S. House of Representatives. He ran for re-election in 1890, but was narrowly defeated by Democrat William W. Dixon in the general election.

Following his failed re-election bid, President Benjamin Harrison appointed Carter as the Commissioner of the General Land Office in 1891. He served as commissioner until 1892, when he was elected chairman of the Republican National Committee, the first Catholic to do so.

Early life and career

Childhood and youth 

Carter was born to Irish immigrant parents on October 30, 1854, in a small village known as Junior Furnace, near Portsmouth, Scioto County, Ohio.  His parents, Edward and Margaret (Byrnes) Carter, came to the United States in 1849 or 1850 following the Great Famine.  They were married in Wheeling, West Virginia, shortly after their arrival in the U.S., Edward converting to Catholicism from the Anglican Church due to Margaret's influence.  The Carters settled in Junior Furnace, Ohio by 1852 when their first son, Richard, was born.  Shortly after Thomas' birth in 1854 the family moved to a farm a few miles from Junior Furnace.

Following the end of the Civil War in 1865, the Carters used their savings and moved to Pana, Illinois, where young Tommy Carter attended the common schools and worked on his parents' farm. Edward Carter instilled in his children a love for reading and with it a love of learning.  Early in his adult life, following his family's loss of their farm due to a lightning-caused fire burning their barn and killing their farm animals, Thomas Carter engaged in railroad work and school teaching.

Career and marriage 

For several years, Carter worked as a travelling salesman for a book publisher based in Burlington, Iowa.  After the premature death of his mother to pneumonia in March 1879, Carter moved his two younger sisters, Julia and Margaret, and a younger brother, Edward Jr., to be with him in Burlington, Iowa, where he now worked as head of the sales department of the publishing company, while their father worked in Kentucky.  Thomas and his sisters formed a particular bond in these years in Burlington as he supported them and cared for them as a father.  After many long years of studying the law, Carter finally passed the bar examination in Nebraska while there on a business trip (likely in 1881, though the record is unclear).

In May 1882, at the advice of friends, he moved from Burlington to Helena, Montana, ostensibly to begin his law career there.  After a brief stint selling books again, he formed a law partnership with Helena lawyer, John B. Clayton. Within a year of arriving in Helena, Carter sent for his sisters and brother in Burlington to join him.  From his childhood Carter nurtured a close relationship with the Catholic Church, and upon his arrival in Helena this relationship continued and even strengthened.  On January 27, 1886, Carter married Ellen Lillian Galen, the daughter of Montana pioneers, Hugh F. Galen and Matilda Gillogly Galen, at the cathedral in St. Paul, Minnesota.

Political career

Territorial delegate 

Carter's first foray into public office in Montana was in the role of public administrator for Lewis and Clark County. In 1888, he was nominated as the Republican candidate for the position of Territorial Delegate to Congress.  In the general election in November he faced Butte copper king and Democrat William Clark, making his first of numerous attempts at federal office.  Carter upset Clark by winning the three largely Democratic counties of Silver Bow, Deer Lodge, and Missoula, likely with the assistance of Marcus Daly, another influential Montana Democratic copper king and enemy of Clark.  Montana's Irish voters, who disliked Clark, also likely helped Carter to victory.  This particular election is said to have initiated the famous "War of the Copper Kings." Nonetheless, Carter was elected as a Delegate to Congress and served a short term from March 4, 1889, to November 7, 1889, when the Territory of Montana was admitted as a state into the Union.

United States House 

The people of Montana again elected Carter as their first Representative to Congress on October 1, 1889, when he defeated long-time territorial delegate and leading Montana Democrat Martin Maginnis, and he served from November 8, 1889, to March 3, 1891. Importantly, Carter served as chairman of the Committee on Mines and Mining, a remarkable achievement for a freshman legislator in the House of Representatives, and, as one historian suggested, due to his friendship with legendary Speaker of the House Thomas B. Reid of Maine.  Carter was an unsuccessful candidate in 1890 for reelection, losing a close election to Butte lawyer and Democrat William W. Dixon by 283 votes, or less than 1% of the total votes cast.  President Benjamin Harrison appointed Carter as the Commissioner of the General Land Office from 1891 to 1892, when he was elected chairman of the Republican National Committee.  He was the first Catholic to be the chairman of the Republican Party.

United States Senate 

Carter was elected as a Republican to the United States Senate and served from March 4, 1895, until March 3, 1901. As a Senator he was chairman of the Committee on Relations with Canada (Fifty-fourth Congress), the Committee on the Census (Fifty-fifth and Fifty-sixth Congresses).  President William McKinley appointed him a member of the board of commissioners of the Louisiana Purchase Exposition and he served as its president.  Carter was elected again as a Republican to the United States Senate and served from March 4, 1905, to March 3, 1911. He was not a candidate for reelection. He died from a lung infarction while at home in Washington, D.C., on September 17, 1911. His funeral was held at St. Paul's Roman Catholic Church, and he was interred at Mount Olivet Cemetery in the city.

Legacy 

In Glacier National Park, two natural features are named for Thomas H. Carter: a glacier and a peak.  Two towns in Montana named for Carter are Carter in Chouteau County, and Cartersville in Rosebud County.  Carter County, Montana was also named in his honor in 1917.

Citations

References

Further reading
Thomas H. Carter Papers at the Library of Congress
 Thomas Carter Correspondence Selections and Related Material (1901–1971), Merrill G. Burlingame Special Collections Library, Montana State University Collection website

|-

|-

|-

|-

|-

|-

|-

1854 births
1911 deaths
People from Scioto County, Ohio
American people of Irish descent
American Roman Catholics
Delegates to the United States House of Representatives from Montana Territory
Republican Party members of the United States House of Representatives from Montana
Republican Party United States senators from Montana
Republican National Committee chairs
19th-century American politicians
Carter County, Montana
General Land Office Commissioners
People from Pana, Illinois
People from Portsmouth, Ohio
Politicians from Burlington, Iowa
Politicians from Helena, Montana
Montana lawyers
Burials at Mount Olivet Cemetery (Washington, D.C.)
19th-century American lawyers